The 2014 AFL season was the 118th season in the Australian Football League contested by the Sydney Swans.

Squad for 2014
Statistics are correct as of end of 2013 season.
Flags represent the state of origin, i.e. the state in which the player played his Under-18s football.

For players: (c) denotes captain, (vc) denotes vice-captain, (lg) denotes leadership group.
For coaches: (s) denotes senior coach, (cs) denotes caretaker senior coach, (a) denotes assistant coach, (d) denotes development coach.

Playing list changes

The following summarises all player changes between the conclusion of the 2013 season and the beginning of the 2014 season.

In

Out

List management

Season summary

Pre-season matches

Home and away season

Finals matches

Ladder

Team awards and records
Season records
Sydney broke the 40,000 members milestone for the first time.
Between Round 5 and Round 17 the Swans record 12 wins in a row, equaling the club record last set in 1935.
Sydney's score of 19.22 (136) in the Preliminary Final broke the club record for biggest score in a final.
Sydney's winning margin of 71 points in the Preliminary Final broke the club record for biggest victory in a final.

Individual awards and records

Bob Skilton Medal

Rising Star Award - Harry Cunningham

Dennis Carroll Trophy for Most Improved Player – Ben McGlynn

Barry Round Shield for Best Clubman – Jarrad McVeigh

Paul Kelly Players’ Player – Luke Parker

Paul Roos Award for Best Player in a Finals Series – Lance Franklin

Coleman Medal
Lance Franklin won the 2014 Coleman medal with 67 goals, from Jay Schulz with 64 goals.

Milestones
Round 1 - Rhyce Shaw (100 club games)
Round 2 - Nick Smith (100 career games), Josh Kennedy (100 club games)
Round 7 - Rhyce Shaw (200 career games), Tom Derickx (first goal), Jake Lloyd (first goal)
Round 11 - Lance Franklin (600 career goals)
Round 12 - Heath Grundy (150 career games)
Round 13 - Kieren Jack (150 career games)
Round 15 - Zak Jones (first goal)
Round 16 - Adam Goodes (341 games, most by an Indigenous footballer)
Round 21 - Lance Franklin (200 career games), Dean Towers (first goal)
Round 23 - Lewis Jetta (100 career games)
Preliminary Final - Adam Goodes (350 career games)
Grand Final - Ben McGlynn (100 club games)

Debuts
Round 1 - Lance Franklin (club debut), Jeremy Laidler (club debut)
Round 2 - Tom Derickx (club debut)
Round 5 - Jake Lloyd (debut)
Round 14 - Zak Jones (debut)
Round 17 - Dean Towers (debut)
Round 19 - Tim Membrey (debut)

All-Australian Team
Lance Franklin - Full-forward
Josh Kennedy - Centre
Nick Malceski - Half-back flank
Nick Smith - Back pocket
Luke Parker (nominated)

AFL Rising Star
The following Sydney players were nominated for the 2014 NAB AFL Rising Star award:
Round 15 – Harry Cunningham (nominated)
Round 21 – Jake Lloyd (nominated)

22 Under 22 team
Luke Parker - Wing

Reserves results

Regular season

Finals series

Ladder

References

Sydney Swans seasons
Sydney